Alfonso Navarro Oviedo was a Roman Catholic priest in El Salvador who was shot on May 11, 1977, on the outskirts of San  Salvador. He served under Archbishop Óscar Arnulfo Romero y Galdámez.

External links
 REPORT ON THE SITUATION OF HUMAN RIGHTS IN EL SALVADOR, CHAPTER II, RIGHT TO LIFE (1978)
 El Salvador After 1979:  Forces in the Conflict Major Charles O. Skipper, USMC (1984)

Year of birth missing
1977 deaths
20th-century Salvadoran Roman Catholic priests
20th-century Roman Catholic martyrs
Catholic martyrs of El Salvador